Bandra (/bæːndra/; station code: B for Suburban services and BA for Indian Railways) is a railway station on the Western Line and Harbour Line of the Mumbai Suburban Railway network. It serves the Bandra suburban area and the commercial area of Bandra-Kurla Complex (BKC). Bandra Terminus is near to Bandra railway station and serves interstate traffic on the Western Railway.

The station is a Grade-I heritage structure. The other 4 railway stations on Mumbai's heritage list include Chhatrapati Shivaji Maharaj Terminus, Western Railways Headquarters Building (Churchgate), Byculla railway station and Reay Road railway station.

All fast and slow commuter trains have a halt at this station. Bandra is also directly connected to Chhatrapati Shivaji Terminus through Harbour Line via . BEST buses are also available from Bandra Terminus bus stand or Bandra (West) bus stand ; both being very close to the railway station. Auto rickshaws are also available.

Gallery

References

Railway stations opened in 1869
Bandra
1869 establishments in India
Railway stations in Mumbai Suburban district
Mumbai Suburban Railway stations
Mumbai WR railway division